Ifeanyichukwu Otuonye (born 27 June 1994) is a long jumper. Born in Nigeria, he represents the Turks and Caicos Islands. He competed at the 2015 World Championships in Beijing without recording a valid jump.
 
His personal best in the event is 8.03 meters (+0.1 m/s) set in Gold Coast, Australia in 2018, at the XXI Commonwealth Games. This is the current national record.

Competition record

References

1994 births
Living people
Sportspeople from Benin City
Nigerian emigrants to the United Kingdom
Immigrants to the Turks and Caicos Islands
Naturalised citizens of the United Kingdom
Turks and Caicos Islands long jumpers
Turks and Caicos Islands male athletes
Male long jumpers
World Athletics Championships athletes for Turks and Caicos Islands
Athletes (track and field) at the 2014 Commonwealth Games
Athletes (track and field) at the 2018 Commonwealth Games
Commonwealth Games competitors for the Turks and Caicos Islands
Competitors at the 2018 Central American and Caribbean Games
Turks and Caicos Islands people of Nigerian descent
British sportspeople of Nigerian descent
Athletes (track and field) at the 2022 Commonwealth Games